Dieida is a genus of moths of the family Cossidae. The genus was erected by Embrik Strand in 1911.

Species
Dieida ahngeri (Grum-Grshimailo, 1902)
Dieida judith Yakovlev, 2008
Dieida ledereri (Staudinger, 1871)

References

Cossinae
Moth genera